Amy Binsfeld ( Radue; born 1976) is an American Republican politician from Sheboygan County, Wisconsin.  She is a member of the Wisconsin State Assembly, representing Wisconsin's 27th Assembly district since January 2023.

Biography
Amy Binsfeld was born Amy Radue in Howards Grove, Wisconsin, and graduated from Manitowoc Lutheran High School in Manitowoc, Wisconsin.  Shortly after graduating, she went to work in her family's 100-year-old business, Bitter Neumann Appliance Furniture Mattress, which has been her primary employer ever since.  She returned to school later in life and earned a degree in paralegal studies in 2012.

Political career
In April 2022, incumbent Wisconsin state representative Tyler Vorpagel announced that he would not run for re-election later that year.  A week later, Binsfeld announced her candidacy for the Republican nomination in Vorpagel's heavily Republican 27th Assembly district.  Surprisingly, no other candidates chose to stand for election in the 27th district, and Binsfeld was unopposed in the Republican primary.  Another candidate did eventually join the general election race, when retired former five-term Democratic state representative Chester A. Gerlach chose to come out of retirement to try to win the seat as an independent.

Binsfeld ultimately prevailed in the 2022 general election with 64% of the vote.  She will take office in January 2023.

Personal life and family
Amy Radue took the name Binsfeld when she married Nicholas "Nick" Binsfeld in July 2002.  They lived for several years in Plymouth, Wisconsin, before moving to their present home in the town of Mosel. They have two children.  Nick works for the Department of Public Works in the city of Sheboygan.

Electoral history

Wisconsin Assembly (2022)

| colspan="6" style="text-align:center;background-color: #e9e9e9;"| General Election, November 8, 2022

References

External links
 
 Amy Binsfeld at Wisconsin Vote
 Bitter Neumann Appliance Furniture Mattress

1976 births
Living people
Republican Party members of the Wisconsin State Assembly
People from Mosel, Wisconsin
21st-century American women politicians
Women state legislators in Wisconsin
21st-century American politicians